Corning Municipal Airport may refer to:

Corning Municipal Airport (Arkansas) in Corning, Arkansas, United States (FAA: 4M9)
Corning Municipal Airport (California) in Corning, California, United States (FAA: 0O4)
Corning Municipal Airport (Iowa) in Corning, Iowa, United States (FAA: CRZ)

See also
Corning Airport (disambiguation)